Clive Victor Ramaciotti (1883 — 3 August 1967) was an Australian philanthropist who with his sister, Vera Ramaciotti, established the Clive and Vera Ramaciotti Foundation.

Biography
Ramaciotti was the only son of Ada and Gustave Mario Ramaciotti, the owner of the Theatre Royal in King Street, Sydney, Australia. He was born in Ashfield and attended Newington College (1894–1900).  After leaving school he worked in banking and as a stockbroker and on the death of his father he was a man of independent means. At the time of his death he left to his sister an estate of $1.7 million. Death duties were estimated to be $830,000.

Legacy
He was interested in bio-medical research and with his sister Vera, planned the establishment of the Clive and Vera Ramaciotti Foundation. The Foundation was established with an investment of $6.7 million and is managed by Perpetual Trustees. The funds combined capital is in excess of $60 million. A Scientific Advisory Committee advises Perpetual on the grants to be awarded each year. In 1970, when the Foundation had accumulated interest of $600,000, initial payments were made to 27 institutions. Since its establishment the fund has allocated over $45 million to biomedical research supporting more than 3000 research programs.

References

External links
 Perpetual Trustees
 The Clive & Vera Ramaciotti Centre for Gene Function 
 ANU Research Centre
 Vera Ramaciotti - Biography

Australian philanthropists
1967 deaths
People educated at Newington College
Australian stockbrokers
1883 births
20th-century philanthropists